Shamsul Islam (born 2 September 1994) is a Bangladeshi cricketer. He made his first-class debut for Barisal Division in the 2011–12 National Cricket League on 21 November 2011. He made his Twenty20 debut on 23 June 2021, for Legends of Rupganj in the 2021 Dhaka Premier Division Twenty20 Cricket League.

References

External links
 

1994 births
Living people
Bangladeshi cricketers
Place of birth missing (living people)
Barisal Division cricketers
Agrani Bank Cricket Club cricketers
Legends of Rupganj cricketers